Misaki Doi and Elina Svitolina were the defending champions, but Doi decided not to participate.
Svitolina partnered Daria Gavrilova and successfully defended the title, defeating Çağla Büyükakçay and Jelena Janković in the final, 5–7, 6–1, [10–4].

Seeds

Draw

References
 Main Draw

2015 in Istanbul
2015 in Turkish tennis
Istanbul Cup - Doubles
İstanbul Cup
İstanbul Cup